South Twin Lake having about  is wholly within Penobscot County, Maine. It is part of the watershed of the West Branch of the Penobscot River.

Parallel to the east side of the lake is Route 11 and the tracks of the Montreal, Maine and Atlantic Railway. A gravel-surfaced road called Turkey Tail services the south side camps and connects to Route 11 at Partridge Cove. The lake has several rocks which are navigation hazards and in the spring of the year, one should be on the lookout for drifting logs.

Ice has gone out as soon as April 13, but usually goes out around May 1. The lake is surrounded by second growth forests consisting of hemlock, red spruce, balsam fir and scattered white pines. The broad-leaf component of the forest is aspen, white and yellow birch, red oak, red and sugar maple, and black ash. Tributaries include Lincoln Brook at the northwest end, and east and west Ragged Brooks coming in from the south. Fish include yellow and white perch, atlantic salmon, brook trout, eels, chain pickerel, hornpout, whitefish, chubs.  Henry David Thoreau passed this lake in the evening of Saturday, September 5, 1846 while paddling up North Twin Lake, but did not enter South Twin.

Islands and Reefs
Larger islands include Len's Island (Isle of Len) (Private) near the south shore just east of Ragged Brook and Peanut Island, having some large boulders in the northeast part of the lake.   There is a reef of rocks extending north from Peanut Island to the Rock Pile which is on the northern boundary of South Twin Lake.

History

The history is primarily that of the North Twin Dam. Thoreau mentions that there is an abundance of large white pine around South Twin. In 1836 and 1839, the Maine legislature passed acts whereby dams could be built at Chesuncook and North Twin Lake. Apparently the North Twin dam was not built in 1839 but by 1846 the dam had a  head. The present dam was established by the Great Northern Paper Company in 1903–04 and was built by J.B. Mullen.

Citations
 The Maine Woods by Henry David Thoreau
 The Penobscot Boom and the Development of the West Branch of the Penobscot River for Log Driving 1825–1931 by Alfred Geer Hempstead, Copyright 1975

External links
  Describes the boat ramp and islands
 
Describes the lake fish and a map (PDF)

Reservoirs in Maine
Lakes of Penobscot County, Maine
North Maine Woods
Penobscot River